World Wrestling Legends was a professional wrestling event produced by Mirabilis Ventures and promoted by Sal Corrente, which was held on March 5, 2006. It was titled 6:05 - The Reunion as a tribute to the program WCW Saturday Night, which aired weekly for many years at 6:05 P.M. on TBS. The event featured many notable wrestlers who appeared on it (as well as guests who inspired it and backstage staff who worked on it) and also included a reunion of the Nitro Girls. "6:05 - The Reunion" was taped for pay-per-view and broadcast on April 29, 2006.

6:05 - The Reunion

Staff
Director - Craig Leathers
Producers/Bookers - Jimmy Hart and Colin Bowman
Agents - Jimmy Hart, Colin Bowman, Dave Hebner, and Tom Prichard
Gorilla Position - Tom Prichard and Dave Sierra
Security - Doug Dillinger
Ring Announcer - David Penzer
Referees - Dave Hebner, Earl Hebner, and Brian Hebner
Commentators - Jim Cornette, Ron Niemi, Corey Maclin (who also conducted backstage interviews) and Lance Russell

Results

See also
WrestleReunion

Notes

External links

http://www.wrestleview.com/news2005/1138660868.shtml

2006 in professional wrestling in Florida
2006 in professional wrestling
2000s in Orlando, Florida
March 2006 events in the United States
Professional wrestling shows in Orlando, Florida